Pistacia khinjuk is a species of plant in the family Anacardiaceae native to Egypt, western Asia and parts of the Himalayas. The tree grows up to 10 metres. The epithet comes from the name for the plant in Balochistan, khinjuk.

References

khinjuk
Flora of Egypt
Flora of Western Asia
Flora of the Indian subcontinent